Midway Crossings is an enclosed shopping mall located at 7795 West Flagler Street next to the Palmetto Expressway in Miami, Florida. The anchor stores are The Home Depot, Costco, Marshalls, Ross Dress for Less, and a Florida Department of Highway Safety and Motor Vehicles office. There is 1 vacant anchor store that was once TigerDirect. In 2020, Burlington filled that vacancy.

History
At its grand opening in 1970, it was known as Midway Mall. It was built by local developer G. C. Evans. The name change to Mall of the Americas took place in December 1987.

Former anchor department stores included Richard's, Jefferson Ward, and Woolco, all of which closed in the 1980s. The Woolco store was converted in 1983 to a discount clothing store called Winston's.

After falling to 30 percent occupancy, the mall was re-tenanted to target a middle-class Latin American clientele. This renovation added discount anchors such as Marshalls, plus an L. Luria & Sons and The Home Depot, the latter of which took the former Woolco after Winston's closed. The mall was also renamed Mall of the Americas, and an eight-screen AMC Theatres multiplex was added.AMC added six additional screens. Another notable tenant after the redevelopment was the first Forever 21 clothing store outside the chain's home base of California, however it is now closed. Other retailers now at the mall include Old Navy Outlet, Ross Dress for Less and 14-screen AMC Theatres at the north end of the mall.

There is also Santa Cruz Furniture Store on the 2nd floor at the south end of the mall that was opened in the 1980s till the mid-1990s as it was replaced by TigerDirect office.

Tico Clothing store used to be located on the north side of the mall in 1980s till it was relocated to the south of the mall in the early 1990s as the Home Depot extends. In the mid-1990s, it was closed for TigerDirect store to take over.

Luria's the Jewelry and Gifts store closed in mid-1990s at the south end of the mall and replaced by Ross Dress for Less

The Home Depot moved to a new stand-alone building in 2003. There is also a TigerDirect store on the side of the mall that Burlington Coat Factory occupies. In 2010, the Tiger Direct outlet moved from the right of their corporate headquarters to the left, to allow mall access directly across from Ross. Two of the secondary entrances to the mall have several strip mall type stores near them that also have no mall access.  In October 2015, it was announced that part of the north wing of the mall would be demolished to make room for Costco Wholesale, which is relocating to the mall.  As a result, the AMC Theatres closed in December 2015. As of June 1, 2016, the north wing of the mall has been demolished, and a newly constructed Costco building and gas station stand in its place.

On August 13, 2009, a 43-year-old woman set herself on fire at the mall, leading to its temporary closure.

In early May 2022, the mall changed its name to Midway Crossings, in light of a major renovation planned by the mall.

References

External links
Official website

Shopping malls in Miami-Dade County, Florida
Shopping malls established in 1970
1970 establishments in Florida